Haji Mohammad Idris who served as acting Governor of the Afghanistan Central Bank from 24 August 2021 to 8 October 2021. Idris was head of the Taliban's finance section, but he has no formal financial training or higher education.

In August 2021, Taliban spokesman Zabiullah Mujahid said in a statement that the leadership of the Islamic Emirate had given Haji Mohammad Idris the responsibility of the Central Bank of Afghanistan. The purpose of the appointment is to organize government institutions and the banking system and solve public problems.

References

Living people
Governors of Da Afghanistan Bank
Central bankers
Taliban leaders
Year of birth missing (living people)